Taupo Intermediate School is a medium-sized intermediate school (year 7 and year 8) located in Taupo, New Zealand.

References

External links
School website
Te Kete Ipurangi
Education Review Office 2010 report

Intermediate schools in New Zealand
Taupō
Schools in the Taupo District